Catherine Allgor is an American historian focusing on women and early American history; she has written and lectured extensively on Dolley Madison and the founding generation of American women. Since 2017 she has served as the president of the Massachusetts Historical Society. Previously Allgor was appointed to the James Madison Memorial Fellowship Foundation by President Barack Obama and has served as the Nadine and Robert A. Skotheim Director of Education at the Huntington Library in San Marino, California. Formerly she was a Professor of History and UC Presidential Chair at the University of California, Riverside, and has taught at Claremont McKenna College, Harvard University, and Simmons University. Allgor was a Frances Perkins Scholar at Mount Holyoke College and received her PhD from Yale University where she was awarded the Yale Teaching Award. Her dissertation was awarded best dissertation in American history at Yale and received the Lerner-Scott Prize for the Best Dissertation in U.S. Women's History.

Works
Books
 Allgor, C. (2000). Parlor Politics: In which the ladies of Washington help build a city and a government. University of Virginia Press.
 Allgor, C. (2006). A Perfect Union: Dolley Madison and the Creation of the American Nation. MacMillan/Henry Holt & Co. 
 Cutts, M. E. E., & Allgor, C. (2012). The Queen of America: Mary Cutts’s life of Dolley Madison. University of Virginia Press.
 Allgor, C. (2013). Dolley Madison: The Problem of National Unity. Routledge.
 Allgor, C., & M. M. Heffrom. (2013). A Monarch in a Republic. In D. Waldstreicher (Ed.), A Companion to John Adams and John Quincy Adams. John Wiley and Sons.
 Allgor, C. (2016). Dolley Madison: A Case Study in Southern Style. In C. A. Kierner & S. G. Treadway (Eds.), Virginia Women: Their Lives and Times (Vol. 1). University of Georgia Press.
 Allgor, C. (2018). "Remember... I'm Your Man": Masculinity, Marriage, and Gender in Hamilton. In R. C. Romano, & C. B. Potter (Eds.), Historians on Hamilton: How a Blockbuster Musical Is Restaging America’s Past. Rutgers University Press.

Journal articles
 Allgor, C. (1997). "A Republican in a Monarchy": Louisa Catherine Adams in Russia. Diplomatic History, 21(1), 15–43.
 Allgor, C. (2000). "Queen Dolley" Saves Washington City. Washington History, 12(1), 54–69.
 Allgor, C. (2012). Margaret Bayard Smith’s 1809 Journey to Monticello and Montpelier: The Politics of Performance in the Early Republic. Early American Studies, 10(1), 30–68.
 Allgor, C. (2015). “Believing the Ladies Had Great Influence”: Early National American Women’s Patronage in Transatlantic Context. American Political Thought, 4(1), 39–71.

See also
 Edith B. Gelles
 Amy S. Greenberg
 Monica Muñoz Martinez

References

Notes

References

External links
 Catherine Allgor. C-SPAN
 Political women in the early United States, National Library of Scotland.
 Finding Dolley: A Lesson on Why We Should Study First Ladies, Southern Methodist University.
 Ghosts in the Machinery: Women and the U.S. Constitution, Georgetown University.
 Dolley Madison as First Laby, James Madison Memorial Foundation.
 Dolley Madison: Republican Queen, James Madison Memorial Foundation.
 Coverture: the Word Every American Should Know, with Catherine Allgor for NHA University, Nantucket History.

21st-century American historians
20th-century American historians
Living people
Historians from California
Year of birth missing (living people)
Mount Holyoke College alumni
Yale College alumni
Claremont McKenna College faculty
Harvard University faculty